Rebel Without a House (Spanish:Rebelde sin casa) is a 1960 Mexican comedy film directed by Benito Alazraki and starring Germán Valdés, Ana Bertha Lepe and Óscar Ortiz de Pinedo.

Cast
 Germán Valdés as Teodoro Silva  
 Ana Bertha Lepe as Julieta 
 Óscar Ortiz de Pinedo as Don Virgilio Danuncio  
 Carlos Riquelme as Lic. Vivaldi 
 Marcelo Chávez as Señor San Pedro  
 Arturo Soto Rangel as Señor juez  
 Hortensia Clavijo as Secuaz de San Pedro  
 Josefina Holguín as Secuaz de San Pedro  
 Salvador Flores as Agustín  
 Salvador Gómez 
 Yolanda Margain
 Armando Acosta as Policía  
 Daniel Arroyo as Espectador  
 Carlos Bravo y Fernández
 Blanca Carrera 
 Ángel Di Stefani as Hombre infiel  
 Enedina Díaz de León as Espectadora  
 Pedro Elviro as Cuidador 
 Jesús Gómez as Policía 
 Leonor Gómez as Vendedora de papaya  
 Guillermo Hernández as Criminal pelón  
 Chel López as Inspector  
 Concepción Martínez as Anciana escucha radio  
 Roberto Meyer as Policía  
 José Muñoz as Dueño carro robado  
 Rubén Márquez as Espectador  
 Carlos Robles Gil as Espectador  
 Hernán Vera as Tendero

References

Bibliography 
 Carlos Monsiváis & John Kraniauskas. Mexican Postcards. Verso, 1997.

External links 
 

1960 films
1960 comedy films
Mexican comedy films
1960s Spanish-language films
Films directed by Benito Alazraki
Films with screenplays by Abel Santa Cruz
1960s Mexican films